Cairngaan, Wigtownshire, is the southmost settlement in Scotland. The hamlet of Cairngaan lies just north of the Mull of Galloway (which contains Scotland's most southerly point, and a lighthouse, but no villages) on the B7041, after a turn-off from the B7065 road. The village is at the extreme end of the B7401. As a result of Cairngaan's southerly location, the town lies south of the English cities of Newcastle upon Tyne, Sunderland and Carlisle.

Nearby settlements include Drummore and Kirkmaiden to the near north. Around 18 miles (29 km) away is Stranraer and the ferry to Northern Ireland.

See also
 Extreme points of the United Kingdom

References

External links

Villages in Dumfries and Galloway